Isthmohyla infucata is a species of frogs in the family Hylidae endemic to Panama.

Its natural habitats are subtropical or tropical moist montane forests, freshwater marshes, and intermittent freshwater marshes. Infucata is threatened by habitat loss.

Sources

Isthmohyla
Amphibians described in 2001
Fauna of Panama
Taxonomy articles created by Polbot